CLEAR’S is a Japanese idol girl group. Their last three singles reached the top ten on the weekly Oricon Singles Chart, with "Yogoshitakunai cry" being their best-charting single, reaching the third place on the chart.

Discography

Singles

References

Japanese girl groups
Japanese idol groups